The Hotel de l’Orient is an 18th-century  hotel in Puducherry, India. It was founded in 1664 by the Compagnie des Indes Orientales (French East India Company).

Description
The mansion which houses the Hotel de l’Orient dates back to the late 1760s when Pondicherry was rebuilt.

References

External links 
 

Hotels in India
Tourism in Puducherry
Heritage hotels in India